Qonaqlı is a village in the municipality of Qaradaş in the Tovuz Rayon of Azerbaijan.

References

Populated places in Tovuz District